The Cybernetic Grandma (Czech: Kybernetická babička) is a 1962 Czechoslovakian stop motion puppet cartoon. It is a surreal science fiction-horror animation film, showing a dystopian situation where machines tend humans into a cybernetic lifestyle. The story is seen through the eyes of a little child who is led by his grandmother to enter an underground world. There it witnesses many strange events and ends up being cared for by a cybernetic grandma looking like a hybrid between a robotic wheelchair and a giant moth. The film shows a contradiction between the kind and sweet way the machine talks to the child and its disturbingly cold insensitive behavior. The cybernetic grandma is portrayed by the mechanically accurate and formally perfect voice and language of Czech actress Otýlie Benšíková. At the end of the movie, the little child is rescued by its true biological grandma, who turns off the cybernetic one and takes care of it.

References
 Martin Flašar, "Jan Novák, Jiří Trnka A Jejich Kybernetická Babička", Musicologica Brunensia 48, 2013, 1.

External links
 
 Film review at www.weirdwildrealm.com by Paghat the Ratgirl

1962 films
1960s Czech-language films
1962 animated films
1960s dystopian films
Films directed by Jiří Trnka
1960s science fiction horror films
Czech science fiction horror films
1960s Czech films